KYNG may refer to:

 Kyng (band), a hard rock band formed in 2008 in Los Angeles
 KYNG (AM), a radio station (1590 AM) licensed to Springdale, Arkansas
 KRLD-FM, a radio station (105.3 FM) licensed to Dallas, Texas, United States, which used the call sign KYNG from March 1992 to March 2003
 the ICAO code for Youngstown–Warren Regional Airport